United States v. O'Hagan, 521 U.S. 642 (1997), was a United States Supreme Court case concerning insider trading and breach of U.S. Securities and Exchange Commission Rule 10(b) and 10(b)-5. In an opinion written by Justice Ruth Bader Ginsburg, the Court held that an individual may be found liable for violating Rule 10(b)-5 by misappropriating confidential information. The Court also held that the Securities and Exchange Commission did not exceed its rulemaking authority when it adopted Rule 14e-3(a), "which proscribes trading on undisclosed information in the tender offer setting, even in the absence of a duty to disclose".

Background 
James O'Hagan was a partner at Minneapolis law firm Dorsey & Whitney. In July 1988, the firm was retained by Grand Metropolitan, a corporation with headquarters in London, which was considering an offer to takeover the Pillsbury Company, headquartered in Minneapolis. Even though he was not directly involved in the transaction, O'Hagan learned about the possible takeover by overhearing a discussion at lunch. In August 1988, O'Hagan began purchasing stock and options of the Pillsbury company, at around $39 per share.

By the end of September, O'Hagan owned approximately 5,000 shares of Pillsbury and 2,500 options – more than any other individual investor. In October, Grand Met announced the takeover bid and the price of Pillsbury stock rose to $60 per share. O'Hagan subsequently sold his stock at a profit of more than $4.3 million.

Opinion of the Court 
The Court held that O'Hagan could be found liable under Rule 10(b) for misappropriating confidential information, and the court remanded the case the United States Court of Appeals for the Eighth Circuit for further proceedings. Because O'Hagan was not directly involved in the proposed takeover, he was not obliged by SEC rules to refrain from trading Pillsbury's stock or to disclose his transactions. Though it didn't find O'Hagan in violation of SEC rules regarding trading by company insiders – known as the "classical doctrine theory" – the Supreme Court adopted an additional doctrine, the "misappropriation theory" set out by Chief Justice Warren Burger in Chiarella v. United States.

See also

 List of United States Supreme Court cases, volume 521
 List of United States Supreme Court cases
 Lists of United States Supreme Court cases by volume
 List of United States Supreme Court cases by the Rehnquist Court

References

External links
 

1997 in United States case law
United States Supreme Court cases
United States Supreme Court cases of the Rehnquist Court
United States securities case law